Luigi Martini (born 15 June 1949) was an Italian footballer who played as a defender. On 29 December 1974, he represented the Italy national football team on the occasion of a friendly match against Bulgaria in a 0–0 home draw.

Honours

Player
Lazio
Serie A: 1973–74

References

1949 births
Italian footballers
Italy international footballers
Italian expatriate footballers
Association football defenders
Serie A players
Serie B players
Serie C players
Serie D players
S.S.D. Lucchese 1905 players
A.C.N. Siena 1904 players
U.S. Livorno 1915 players
S.S. Lazio players
Chicago Sting (NASL) players
Toronto Blizzard (1971–1984) players
Expatriate soccer players in the United States
Expatriate soccer players in Canada
Living people